The grey-headed piprites (Piprites griseiceps) is a species of bird which traditionally has been placed in the family Tyrannidae. It is found in Costa Rica, Guatemala, Honduras, and Nicaragua. Its natural habitat is subtropical or tropical moist lowland forest.

References

grey-headed piprites
Birds of Honduras
Birds of Nicaragua
Birds of Costa Rica
grey-headed piprites
grey-headed piprites
Taxonomy articles created by Polbot